Wushu was contested by both men and women at the 2006 Asian Games in Doha, Qatar from December 11 to December 14, 2006. It was competed in the disciplines of Taijiquan, Taijijian, Changquan, Daoshu, Jianshu, Gunshu, Qiangshu, Nanquan, Nangun, Nandao, and Sanshou. All events were held at Aspire Hall 3.

Schedule

Medalists

Men's taolu

Men's sanda

Women's taolu

Medal table

Participating nations
A total of 168 athletes from 29 nations competed in wushu at the 2006 Asian Games:

References

External links
Official website

 
2006
2006 Asian Games events
2006 in wushu (sport)